Stong is a surname. Notable people with the surname include:

Alfred Stong (born 1940), Canadian lawyer, judge and former politician
Marijane Stong Canadian figure skating coach
Phil Stong (1899–1957), American writer and journalist
Robert Evert Stong (1936–2008), American mathematician

See also
Mount Stong (see list of mountains in Malaysia)
Þjóðveldisbærinn Stöng, Viking-era long house in Iceland